The Holod is a right tributary of the river Crișul Negru in Romania. It discharges into the Crișul Negru in Râpa. The upper reach of the river, upstream of the village of Luncasprie is known as the Vida. The Vida dam is located on this river. The Holod flows through the villages Luncasprie, Sitani, Pomezeu, Spinuș de Pomezeu, Coșdeni, Albești, Răbăgani, Brătești, Vărășeni, Copăceni, Vintere, Holod and Dumbrava.

Tributaries

The following rivers are tributaries to the Holod:

Left: Cornet, Hârja
Right: Blajul, Videști, Topa, Hidișel, Pârâul Domnului

References

Rivers of Romania
Rivers of Bihor County